The Topeka Terror is a 1945 American Western film directed by Howard Bretherton, written by Patricia Harper and Norman S. Hall, and starring Allan Lane, Linda Stirling, Earle Hodgins, Twinkle Watts, Roy Barcroft and Bud Geary. It was released on January 26, 1945, by Republic Pictures.

Plot
In 1893, a swarm of settlers descended on the town of Red Dust, located on the Cherokee Strip. Land agent Trent Parker (Frank Jaquet) was drowning in gambling debts. To pay them off, he accepts an offer from two swindlers (Roy Barcroft, Bud Geary) who have concocted a scheme to cheat the settlers out of their land. But then government agent Chad Stevens (Allan "Rocky" Lane) rides into town, promising the peaceful settlers that he will drive out the gang of thieves.

Cast  
Allan Lane as Chad Stevens
Linda Stirling as June Hardy
Earle Hodgins as Don Quixote 'Ipso-Facto' Martindale
Twinkle Watts as Midge Hardy
Roy Barcroft as Ben Jode
Bud Geary as Henchman Clyde Flint
Tom London as William Hardy
Frank Jaquet as Land Agent Trent Parker
Jack Kirk as Joe Green
Eva Novak as Mrs. Green 
Robert J. Wilke as Lynch-Mob Member 
Hank Bell as Stagecoach Driver

References

External links 
 

1945 films
American Western (genre) films
1945 Western (genre) films
Republic Pictures films
Films directed by Howard Bretherton
American black-and-white films
1940s English-language films
1940s American films